A list of Hong Kong films released in 2020:

See also
2020 in Hong Kong

References

External links
 IMDB list of Hong Kong films 

2020
Films
Hong Kong
Hong Kong